= Yemen-Vietnam Friendship Association =

The Yemen-Vietnam Friendship Association (Arabic: جمعية الصداقة اليمنية-الفيتنامية) was an organization in the People's Democratic Republic of Yemen (PDRY - South Yemen), promoting stronger relations with Vietnam. In 1981, Ali Nasir Bartoush was the secretary of the association. In 1987, Dr. Abdul Wasa Salam, Minister of Justice of PDRY, served as chairman of the association.
